West Helmsdale railway station served the settlement of West Helmsdale, in the historical county of Sutherland, from 1870 to 1871 on the Duke of Sutherland's Railway.

History 
The station was opened on 1 November 1870 by the Duke of Sutherland's Railway.

References 

Disused railway stations in Highland (council area)
Railway stations in Great Britain opened in 1870
Railway stations in Great Britain closed in 1871
1870 establishments in Scotland
1871 disestablishments in Scotland